This is a list of pornographic film awards from around the world. While pornographic films may not have been around as long as other forms of pornography, they have quickly become the most popular form in which pornography is viewed. The industry has grown to become an important staple of the entertainment world as well as create a large industry within itself. The most well known awards are the AVN Awards with it being the first of its kind as well as the largest and most prestigious. The earliest awards were often obscure and taboo but now many have become so popular and mainstream that many famous stars have even appeared at the events and many artists have also performed during the award shows. Awards for the webcam model industry have also been created with the first being held in 2014.

Europe
European Gay Porn Awards

Australia
Australian Adult Industry Awards

Belgium
Brussels International Festival of Eroticism

Brazil
Sexy Hot Award

Canada
Feminist Porn Award

France
Hot d'Or

Germany
Erotixxx Award
PorYes
Venus Award

Japan
AV Open
Pink Grand Prix
Pinky Ribbon Awards
Sky PerfecTV! Adult Broadcasting Awards

Spain
Barcelona International Erotic Film Festival

United Kingdom
Sexual Freedom Awards
SHAFTA Awards
UK Adult Film and Television Awards

United States
AVN Awards
GayVN Awards
Gay Erotic Video Awards
Golden Dickie Awards
Grabby Awards
Hard Choice Awards
Pornhub Awards
X-Rated Critics Organization

See also
 List of adult industry awards
 List of film awards
 List of film festivals
 Lists of films

References

 
Lists of television awards